Leif Erikson is a Viking ship replica built to commemorate the voyage of Leif Erikson who is credited with reaching North America over one thousand years ago.

History
Leif Erikson was built at Korgen in Nordland, Norway during 1926 at the request of Gerhard Folgerø (1886-1948) for a voyage across the Atlantic Ocean.  The vessel is built of Norway Pine and constructed in the form of a modified knarr. The vessel is 42 feet long, has a 12 feet 9 inches beam and draws 4 feet of water. The elaborate dragon's head and tail were designed by architect Gerhard Johan Lilletvedt of Bergen.

The ship was invited to Duluth, Minnesota by Norwegian-American immigrant  H. H. Borgen. The vessel set sail in 1926 from Bergen traveling to Labrador and then to Boston and New York City. It sailed through the Great Lakes to the western shores of Lake Superior. When Captain Folgerø and his crew landed at Duluth on June 23, 1927, they had traveled a distance of 6,700 miles, the greatest distance for a ship of its size in modern history.

Norwegian-American immigrant and  Duluth businessman Bert Enger (1864-1931), along with the wife of his late business partner, Emil H. Olson (1881-1926), purchased the ship soon after the voyage and donated it to the City of Duluth. The ship was placed on display in Duluth's Lake Park, which was later named Leif Erikson Park.

Restoration
Leif Erikson steadily deteriorated after years of neglect and vandalism, and by 1980 was in such poor condition that it was even considered that the ship be burned in the traditional Viking manner of putting a ship to rest. This suggestion inspired Emil Olson's grandson, Will Borg, to bring volunteers together and begin fundraising efforts to restore the ship. Through donations, festivals and other endeavors, the group raised $100,000. Boatbuilders began the restoration in 1991. With restoration nearly complete, the ship was reinstalled on display at the eastern end of Leif Erikson Park in Duluth, Minnesota in 2001. Due to further vandalism and degradation, the ship was again removed from the park by cranes and a flatbed trailer in 2013. "Leif Erikson" has been undergoing further restoration. Fundraising efforts aim to return it to the park in a new, secure display structure. The proposed building is designed by Krech Ojard & Associates and intended to be located near Leif Erikson Park at Superior Street and 10th Avenue East. Leif Erikson is presently housed at the Lafarge cement terminal.

References

Further reading
Folgerø, Gerhard  (1944) Over Nordatlanteren i åpen båt (Oslo: Arthur Rosén)
Johnson, Nathan  (2014)  Legendary Locals of Pine City (Arcadia Publishing)

See also 
Enger Tower

1926 ships
Ships built in Norway
Duluth, Minnesota
Buildings and structures in Duluth, Minnesota
Leif Erikson
Tourist attractions in Duluth, Minnesota
Viking ship replicas
Replica ships
Ships of Norway
Norwegian-American culture